The PSLV-C52 is the 54th mission of the Indian Polar Satellite Launch Vehicle (PSLV) program. The Polar Satellite Launch Vehicle (PSLV)-C52 was launched at 05:59 (IST) on 14 February 2022 with the RISAT-1A(EOS-04), INSPIREsat, INS-2TD as its main payload.

Details 
The PSLV-C52 was launched from the First Launch Pad of the Satish Dhawan Space Centre in Sriharikota, Andhra Pradesh,India. The PSLV C52 rocket carried primary payload, RISAT-1A with 2 other satellites. These will be the INSPIREsat from the IIST and the INS-2TD technology demonstrator from ISRO.

Launch schedule 
The PSLV-C52 was launched at 5:59 (IST) on 14 February 2022.

Mission overview 

 Propellant:
 Stage 1: Composite Solid
 Stage 2: Earth Storable Liquid
 Stage 3: Composite Solid
 Stage 4: Earth Storable Liquid

The PSLV C52 rocket has four stages; each one was self-contained, with its own propulsion system, thereby capable of functioning independently. The first and third stages used composite solid propellants, while the second and fourth stage use earth-storable liquid propellant.

References

External links 

Polar Satellite Launch Vehicle
Spacecraft launched by India in 2022
February 2022 events in India
Rocket launches in 2022